Inés Ferrer Suárez (born 1 June 1990) is a Spanish former professional tennis player.

Ferrer Suárez won two singles and nine doubles titles on the ITF Women's Circuit in her career. On 9 July 2012, she reached her highest singles ranking of 202 WTA whilst her best doubles ranking was 125, on 17 September 2012.

Ferrer Suárez made her WTA Tour main-draw debut at the 2012 Copa Colsanitas, where she qualified for the singles tournament.

ITF finals

Singles (2–5)

Doubles (9–21)

References

External links
 
 

1990 births
Living people
Spanish female tennis players